BRP Malapascua (MRRV-4403) is the third ship of the Parola-class patrol vessels of the Philippine Coast Guard.

Design and features
The Philippine Coast Guard clarified that the ship is a law enforcement vessel and is designed to conduct environmental and humanitarian missions, as well as maritime security operations and patrol missions.

The ship was designed with a bulletproof navigation bridge, and is equipped with fire monitors, night vision capability, a work boat, and radio direction finder capability.

The ship will be equipped with communications and radio monitoring equipment from Rohde & Schwarz, specifically the M3SR Series 4400 and Series 4100 software-defined communication radios, and DDF205 radio monitoring equipment. These equipment enhances the ship's reconnaissance, pursuit and communications capabilities.

Delivery and commissioning
The ship left Yokohama, Japan on February 27, 2017, and arrived in the Port of Manila on March 3, 2017.with CDR Garydale Gimotea being her first commanding officer.

BRP Malapascua was commissioned during a commissioning ceremony held at Philippine Coast Guard headquarters in Manila on March 7, 2017, with CDR Garydale Gimotea being her first commanding officer. The ceremony was attended by the Speaker of the House of Representatives Cong. Pantaleon Alvarez, and Department of Transportation Sec. Arthur Tugade.

Service history 
The ship has distinguished itself in challenging missions. Notable of which are the patrols conducted in Benham Rise, Inabangga, Bohol terrorist incident. The vessel was also stationed in Mindanao conducting security patrols in  the waters Basilan, Jolo, Tawi-tawi and supported the government's campaign in Marawi. Further, BRP Malapascua has resiliently responded to the people of Palawan, during the TS Vinta and TS Agaton, and saved many typhoon victims in Mangsee Island. The Officers and men of BRP Malapascua have effectively carried out the PCG mandates with dedication, competence and selflessness. This fine display of character epitomize the commitment of the true coastguardian.

References

Parola-class patrol boats
2017 ships
Ships built by Japan Marine United